Nicky is a given name, a first name that is frequently a diminutive of Nicole and Nicholas and their variants.

Nicky or variation, may also refer to:

 Nicky (wrestler), stagename of a U.S. pro-wrestler

"Nicky" video game series
 Nicky (game engine recreation), a 2006 re-release of 1992 videogame Nicky Boom
 Nicky 2 (video game), a 1993 videogame, sequel to the 1992 game Nicky Boom, re-released in 2009 as Nicky Boom 2

See also

 Nicky Nicky Nine Doors
 
 'Nique (disambiguation)
 Nikki (disambiguation)
 Nickey (disambiguation)
 Nickie (disambiguation)
 Nicki
 Nikky
 Niky